Wāzakhwā, also known as Mashōṟêy or Marjān, is a village in Paktika Province, in southeastern-central Afghanistan. The town is located within the heartland of the Sulaimankhel tribe of Ghilji Pashtuns.

See also 
 Paktika Province

References 

Populated places in Paktika Province
Villages in Afghanistan